ASTech Paris Région is a French competitiveness cluster specialising in aeronautics, aerospace and embedded systems created in 2007. It is geographically centred on the Île-de-France region. Its members gather every two years in October for the "AeroSpaceDays Paris" business convention to meet with all the global players in the aeronautics and space industries in pre-programmed working meetings.

ASTech Paris Region has the status of an Association under the law of 1901. Its head office is located at Paris–Le Bourget Airport.

References

External links
 Official website

2007 establishments in France
Organizations established in 2007
Science parks in France
Economy of Paris
Organizations based in Paris
Aeronautics organizations
High-technology business districts in France
Buildings and structures in Île-de-France